Semir Smajlagić (born 18 September 1998) is a Bosnian footballer who plays as a forward for JS Kabylie.

Career

Club career
Before the second half of 2017/18, Smajlagić signed for Slovenian side Gorica (Slovenia) after almost signing for St. Gallen in Switzerland and playing for the youth academy of FK Sarajevo, Bosnia and Herzegovina's most successful club, where he received interest from Italy.

In 2019, Smajlagić was sent on loan to Mladost (Doboj Kakanj) in Bosnia and Herzegovina, where he made 16 league appearances and scored 0 goals.

Before the 2021 season, he signed for Astana, Kazakhstan's most successful team. On 2 January 2022, Astana announced that Smajlagić had left the club by mutual consent.
In 2023, he joined JS Kabylie.

References

External links

1998 births
Living people
Sportspeople from Zenica
Association football forwards
Bosnia and Herzegovina footballers
Bosnia and Herzegovina youth international footballers
FK Sarajevo players
ND Gorica players
FK Mladost Doboj Kakanj players
FK Sloboda Tuzla players
FC Astana players
FC Kyzylzhar players
Premier League of Bosnia and Herzegovina players
Slovenian PrvaLiga players
Kazakhstan Premier League players
Bosnia and Herzegovina expatriate footballers
Expatriate footballers in Slovenia
Bosnia and Herzegovina expatriate sportspeople in Slovenia
Expatriate footballers in Kazakhstan
Bosnia and Herzegovina expatriate sportspeople in Kazakhstan